Notch is an unincorporated community in Stone County, in the U.S. state of Missouri. Notch is located just north of Silver Dollar City on Missouri Route 76.

History
A post office called Notch was established in 1895, and remained in operation until 1934. The community was named for "notches" (i.e. blazes) on the road through town.  A variant name was "The Forks".

References

Unincorporated communities in Stone County, Missouri
Unincorporated communities in Missouri